Jack Frost (Morozko) is a 1964 Soviet romantic fantasy film made by Gorky Film Studio. It was based on a traditional Russian fairy tale Morozko. It was directed by Alexander Rou, and starred Eduard Izotov as Ivan, Natalya Sedykh as Nastenka, and Alexander Khvylya as Father Frost. The script was written by Nikolai Erdman. The soundtrack was composed by Nikolai Budashkin, who was inspired by the works of Nikolai Rimsky-Korsakov. A version with an English dub was released in 1966 in the U.S. and was the one also spoofed on the cult TV series Mystery Science Theater 3000.  It was also spoofed by the Rifftrax.com site in 2021.

At the end of 2010, Russia 1 remade the film into a musical, very different from the 1964 film, starring Nikolai Baskov.

Plot
The lovely, humble Nastya is despised by her stepmother who favors her own mean-spirited and ugly daughter, Marfushka. Her meek father is powerless to stop his wife. After forcing Nastenka to knit socks before the rooster crows (with Nastya ultimately imploring the sun to go down again so she can have more time), Nastya's stepmother gives Nastya the tasks of feeding the chickens, watering the cattle, splitting wood, and sweeping the yard. Meanwhile, Ivan finishes his chores and heads out into the woods after receiving some final words of guidance from his mother, such as not forgetting his mother, not harming the weak, and honoring those who are old. To all these pieces of advice Ivan off-handedly replies "Don't worry" repeatedly.

While traveling in the woods, Ivan is accosted by a group of bandits. He quickly distracts them and tosses their wooden clubs so high in the air that he claims they won't fall down again until winter. Later, Ivan meets the elderly Starichok-Borovichok (eng. The Little Old Man - the Little Boletus), who playfully challenges Ivan to try and catch him, offering a prize if he does. Being able to turn invisible, Starichok-Borovichok soon wins and offers a contrite Ivan the prize anyway - a fine bow and quiver of arrows. However, when asked to bow before him in gratitude, Ivan boastfully declares, "The bear may bow before you if you like, but not Ivan" and leaves. Starichok-Borovichok remarks that the bear will indeed bow before him, but it would be Ivan's back that would bend.

Ivan comes across Nastya in the woods, ordered to pour water on a stump to make flowers grow in it. Taken by her beauty, he immediately asks her to marry him, citing his many accomplishments. She demurs, noting that he is too much of a braggart. Eager to prove his worth, he attempts to shoot a mother bear with her cubs. Starichok-Borovichok is watching nearby, and as the panicked Nastya puts her water bucket on his head, he changes Ivan's head into a bear. Horrified at the change, Ivan accuses Nastya of being a witch and runs off, leaving her to weep alone by the stump, her tears causing flowers to grow from it.

Wandering the land, Ivan comes across Starichok-Borovichok again, who scolds Ivan over his selfish nature, and how he never acted selflessly for anyone else. Thinking that all he must do to change back is a good deed, Ivan immediately seeks out people, demanding to know how he can help them; having a bear's head only terrifies them, however, and they all flee from him. He finally comes across an old woman carrying sticks to her home and offers to carry her, despite the distance being over many mountains. Arriving at her home, the woman thanks Ivan, noting how handsome he must be; though Ivan notes he is still a bear and thinks she is mocking him, she explains that she is blind - which is why she didn't run from him. Returning to the woods where he and Nastya first met, Ivan comes across the old woman's walking stick and vows to return it, with no thought of whether or not doing so will benefit him. Nearby, Starichok-Borovichok is pleased at Ivan's selflessness and restores him to human form. 

Meanwhile, the evil stepmother is trying to marry off Marfushka. After dressing her up in fine clothes, covering her in makeup and attaching a false braid on to Marfushka's head, she forces Nastya to wear a rag over her head and puts mud on her face to make her ugly. A wealthy suitor comes and asks Marfushka, who has never done a day's work in her life, to prepare a meal for him. While chasing geese into a pond, Marfushka nearly drowns until she is rescued by Nastya. In the process, Marfushka's braid and makeup wash away and Nastya's beauty is revealed. The suitor and his mother choose Nastya for a bride instead. The stepmother orders her husband to leave Nastya in the woods. On the way, the father decides he's had enough of his wife's bullying and vows to bring Nastenka back home. Believing her stepmother will be even crueler to him for doing so, Nastya jumps off the back of his sleigh. There, she comes across Morozko (Father Frost) bringing winter to the woods. Touched by her kindness and unselfishness, he rescues her from freezing to death and brings her to his home.

Ivan searches for Nastya, now that he's fully human again. He comes across Baba Yaga, whom he pleads for aid to find Nastya. She refuses to help, and after a battle of wills with her moving house (which the old woman loses), she animates a group of trees to kill Ivan. After nearly being cooked alive, Ivan tricks her and threatens to bake the witch in her own oven until she tells him how to find Nastya. After he leaves, the angry Baba Yaga sends her black cat to cause Nastya's death before Ivan can reach her. The enchanted sled sent by the Baba Yaga to show Ivan the way to Nastya leaves him trapped in a snowbank. While Father Frost is running some errands, the cat tricks Nastya into accidentally touching his staff, which freezes her solid. Nastya's father and dog sense that she is in trouble. The stepmother and Marfushka prevent him from leaving, but the dog escapes and rescues Ivan from freezing in the snow. They both arrive at Morozko's home to find her frozen. Ivan pleads for forgiveness for his behavior towards her. The power of love trumps the staff's power, and she is restored. To celebrate, Morozko gives Nastya and Ivan a large dowry of jewels and a horse-driven sleigh for their impending nuptials.

On their way to Ivan's home, he and Nastya are accosted by the bandits he'd encountered before, this time with help from Baba Yaga. After being overpowered, they are saved when the clubs from earlier fall conveniently on the bandits' heads, and they trap the witch in her own giant mortar. They return to the village, where the father welcomes Ivan as his son-in-law but the stepmother becomes jealous and the greedy Marfushka eyes their fortune and demands the same. Unfortunately for her, when Marfushka tries to duplicate Nastya's adventure in the snowbound forest, Morozko is so horrified by her rudeness that he sends her back on a pig-driven sleigh, with a box full of crows as a dowry. The stepmother is humiliated in front of the entire village and the father finally stands up for himself and regain his place as head of the household. Nastya and Ivan have a sumptuous wedding and live happily ever after.

Cast
 Alexander Khvylya as Morozko (Jack Frost in Russian culture)
 Natalya Sedykh as Nastia (called Nastenka by her father)
 Eduard Izotov as Ivan
 Inna Churikova as Marfushka
 Pavel Pavlenko as Nastia's father
 Vera Altayskaya as Nastia's stepmother
 Georgy Millyar as Baba Yaga
 Galina Borisova as Starichok-Borovichok (voiced by Mikhail Yanshin)
 Anatoly Kubatsky as Bandit Chief
 Valentin Bryleev as Suitor
 Tatyana Pelttser as Suitor's mother
 Tatyana Barysheva as Matchmaker
 Varvara Popova as Old Blind Woman
 Zinaida Vorkul as Ivan's mother
 Anastasia Zuyeva as The Storyteller
 Margarita Korabelnikova as Village Girl #3

Awards
 In 1965, the film won the Grand Prize – Lion of San Marco at the 26th Venice International Film Festival in a program of children's and youth films.
 1966 - All-Union Film Festival - Prize for the best film in the category for children's films.
 For the role of Marfushka, the Czech Ambassador Jaroslav Bašta gave Inna Churikova the silver medal of Masaryk.

Legacy
The original Russian version was released on DVD in 2000 by Ruscico under the cover title Morozko. It has nine different subtitle options including English, as well as Russian, English and French audio tracks and special features. It was previously released on VHS by United Home Video under the title Magical Wonderland.

In 1997, the English-dubbed Jack Frost version was featured on the movie-mocking television show Mystery Science Theater 3000 as experiment (episode) #813; it was released on DVD July 13, 2010 as part of the series' Volume XVIII DVD set.  In 2021 the movie was again spoofed as "Father Frost" by Rifftrax.com.

This fairy tale is still very popular in Central and Eastern Europe. The movie has been shown on Czechoslovak (now Czech and Slovak) TV channels (under name Mrazík in Czech and Mrázik in Slovak) annually around Christmas or New Year's Day since 1965. Some critics preferred the Czech dubbing to the original Russian version. Baba Yaga was dubbed in the Czech Republic by František Filipovský.

The video game Fairy Tale about Father Frost, Ivan and Nastya is heavily inspired by the movie.

In 2009, Neil Cicierega produced "Ivanushka", a demo based on the plot of the film, which would later be adapted into the Spirit Phone track "Touch-Tone Telephone". The original version was eventually released to Neil Cicierega's Patreon in January 2018.

See also
Pictures at an Exhibition
The Magic Voyage of Sinbad
The Day the Earth Froze

References

External links
 
 MST3K Episode Guide: Morozko
MST3K version on ShoutFactoryTV
 Review of Ruscico DVD (in Russian, with helpful images)

1964 films
1960s fantasy films
Jack Frost
Films based on Russian folklore
Films based on Slavic mythology
Films shot in Moscow Oblast
Soviet Christmas films
Soviet fantasy films
Gorky Film Studio films
1960s Russian-language films
Films directed by Aleksandr Rou
Baba Yaga
Films based on fairy tales